Levy or Lévy is a surname generally of Hebrew origin. It is a transliteration of the Hebrew  meaning "joining". Another spelling of the surname—among multiple other spellings—is Levi or Lévi.

The surname usually refers to a family claiming Levite descent, which implies a specific social status in the structure of a traditional Jewish community.

Levy and Coen are “Gaelic Irish surname(s) which have a foreign appearance but are nevertheless rarely if ever found indigenous outside Ireland” according to Edward MacLysaght.

Levy can also be—though it is very rarely—a surname of French, Scottish, and Welsh origin. It is then a Lowlands' shortening of the Irish Mac Duinnshléibhe (anglicized Donlevy). When eastern Ireland's kingdom of Ulaid fell to John de Courcy in 1177, many of the MacDonlevy dynasty sought asylum in the Highlands of Scotland. Variant spellings of the Scottish surname Levy are Levey, Leevy and Leavy.

People with the surname Levy/Lévy

In arts and media

Film, television, and theatre
 Caissie Levy (born 1981), Canadian stage actress and singer
 Dani Levy (born 1957), Swiss filmmaker, theatrical director and actor
 Dan Levy (Canadian actor) (born 1983), Canadian actor and TV personality; son of comedic actor Eugene Levy
 David Levy (psychologist) (born 1954), American psychologist, professor, author, and actor
 Deborah Levy (born 1959), British playwright, novelist, and poet
 Eugene Levy (born 1946), Canadian actor
 Gabriel Levy (1881–1965), German film producer
 Hassia Levy-Agron (1923–2001), Israeli dancer
 Jane Levy (born 1989), American actress
 Paul Bern (Paul Levy, 1889–1932), German-American film director, screenwriter and producer
 Scott Anthony Levy (born 1964), American professional wrestler better known as Raven
 Shawn Levy (born 1968), Canadian-American actor, director and producer
 William Levy (actor) (born 1980), Cuban-American actor

In literature and journalism
 Andrea Levy (1956–2019), British author
 Bernard-Henri Lévy (born 1948), French public intellectual and journalist
 Dan Levy (journalist) (born 1978), American sports journalist
 Daniel Levy (pianist) (born 1947), Argentine classical pianist, author and broadcaster
 David Levy (chess player) (born 1945), Scottish chess International Master; writer on chess, software, and games theory
 David Levy (economist), American economist and author
 David Levy (psychologist) (born 1954), American psychologist, professor, author, actor
 David H. Levy (born 1948), Canadian astronomer and science writer
 Deborah Levy (born 1959), British playwright, novelist, and poet
 Gideon Levy (born 1953), Israeli journalist and author
 Hyman Levy (1889–1971), Scottish mathematician, author, and politician
 Moshe Levy (author) (born 1948), Iraq-born author, survivor of the Israeli destroyer Eilat
 Newman Levy (1888–1966), American lawyer and poet
 Oscar Levy (1867–1946), German physician and writer
 Paul Levy (journalist) (born 1941), American-British journalist and author
 Paul M. G. Lévy (1910–2002), Belgian journalist and professor
 Steve Levy (born 1965), ESPN anchor
 Steven Levy (born 1951), American technology writer
 William Levy (author) (1939–2019), American writer

In music
 Barrington Levy (born 1964), Jamaican reggae and dancehall artist
 Dan Levy, French musician and multi-instrumentalist for The Dø
 Daniel Levy (pianist) (born 1947), Argentine classical pianist, author and broadcaster
 Émile Waldteufel (Charles Émile Lévy, 1837–1911), French composer and court pianist to the Empress Eugénie
 Fabien Lévy (born 1968), French composer
 General Levy (Paul Levy, born 1971), London born ragga vocalist
 Hugo Chula Alexander Levy (born 1981), Thai singer-songwriter
 Jacques Levy (1935–2004), American songwriter
 James Levy, American singer, songwriter and producer, best known for song Glorious covered by The Pierces
 Joshua Levy, pianist and arranger for Big Bad Voodoo Daddy
 Lou Levy (pianist) (1928–2001), American jazz pianist and session man
 Louis Levy (1894–1957), English composer and musical director of Gaumont-British studios
 Marvin David Levy (1932–2015), American composer
 Mike Lévy (born 1985), French musician known as Gesaffelstein
 Paul Lhérie (Paul Lévy, 1844–1937), French opera singer
 Yasmin Levy (born 1975), Israeli-Spanish singer-songwriter

In other media
 Bob Levy (comedian) (born 1962), American stand-up comedian and radio personality
 Dan Levy (born 1981), American comedian
 Maya Cohen Levy (born 1955), Israeli artist
 William Alexander Levy (1909–1997), American architect and interior designer
 William Auerbach-Levy (1889–1964), Russian-American painter and artist

In business
 Daniel Levy (businessman) (born 1962), Chairman of the British football club Tottenham Hotspur
 David Levy Yulee (1810–1886), Democratic senator from Florida, industrialist and railroad entrepreneur
 David Guy Levy, president and CEO of Periscope Entertainment
 Delphine Levy (1969–2020), French manager of cultural institutions
 Florence Nightingale Levy (1870–1947), American arts administrator
 Lewis Levy (1815–1885), Australian businessman and politician
 Lou Levy (publisher) (1912–1995), American music publisher who played a key role in the careers of some of the most famous songwriters
 Morris Levy (born 1927), American music industry executive
 Paul F. Levy, former President and CEO of Beth Israel Deaconess Medical Center
 Rami Levy, Israeli discount supermarket owner

In government and politics

United States
 Aaron J. Levy (1881–1955), New York politician and judge
 Bob Levy (New Jersey politician) (born 1947), former mayor of Atlantic City, New Jersey
 David Levy (Israeli politician) (born 1937), Israeli politician
 David A. Levy (born 1953), U.S. Representative from New York
 Harold O. Levy (1952–2018), American lawyer and businessman
 Meyer Levy (1887–1967), New York politician
 Norman J. Levy (1931–1998), American politician
 Samuel D. Levy (1860–1940), New York lawyer and judge
 Steve Levy (politician) (born 1959), American politician
 William M. Levy (1827–1882), U.S. Representative from Louisiana

Other countries
 Andrea Levy (politician) (born 1984), Spanish politician
 Bob Levy (Canadian politician), Canadian politician and judge
 Sir Daniel Levy (politician) (1872–1937), Australian lawyer and politician
 Hyman Levy (1889–1971), Scottish mathematician, author, and politician
 Ian Levy (born 1966), British politician and MP
 Jean-Pierre Lévy (born 1935), French diplomat
 R. Clifford Levy (1905–1971), Canadian politician
 Yolette Lévy (1938-2018), Haitian-born Canadian politician and activist

In military
 André Robert Lévy (1893–1973), French World War I flying ace
 Moshe Levy (author) (born 1948), Iraq-born author, survivor of the Israeli destroyer Eilat
 Simeon Magruder Levy (1774–1807), US Army officer

In science and academia

In biology, medicine, and psychology
 Carl Edvard Marius Levy (1808–1865), Danish obstetrician
 David Levy (psychologist) (born 1954), American psychologist, professor, author, actor
 Jerre Levy (born 1938), American psychologist
 Julia Levy (born 1934), Canadian microbiologist and immunologist
 Oscar Levy (1867–1946), German physician and writer

In mathematics
 Azriel Lévy (born 1934), Israeli mathematician
 Hyman Levy (1889–1971), Scottish mathematician, author, and politician
 Paul Lévy (mathematician) (1886–1971), French mathematician
 Tony Lévy (born 1943), French historian of mathematics

Other academic fields
 Bernard-Henri Lévy (born 1948), French public intellectual and journalist
 Daniel Levy (sociologist) (born 1962), German–American political sociologist
 David Benjamin Levy (fl. 2000s), American musicologist
 David Levy (economist), American economist and author
 David C. Levy (born 1938), American educator, museum director and art historian
 David H. Levy (born 1948), Canadian astronomer and science writer
 David M. Levy, American computer scientist at the University of Washington
 Gertrude Rachel Levy (1884–1966), British author and cultural historian
 Habib Levy (1896–1984), Iranian Jewish historian
Jacob T. Levy (born 1971), American political theorist
 Maurice Lévy (1922–2022), French physicist
 Moshe Levy (chemist) (1927–2015), Israeli professor of chemistry
 Paul M. G. Lévy (1910–2002), Belgian journalist and professor
 Pierre Lévy (born 1956), French philosopher, cultural theorist and media scholar
 Raphaël-Georges Lévy (1853–1933), French economist
 Richard S. Levy (born 1940), American historian and academic
 Uriah P. Levy (1792–1862), American sailor and curator

In sport and games
 Alexander Lévy (born 1990), French golfer
 David Levy (chess player) (born 1945), Scottish chess International Master; writer on chess, software, and games theory
 David Levy (footballer) (born 1963), Israeli footballer
 DeAndre Levy (born 1987), American Detroit Lions linebacker
 Edward Lawrence Levy (1851–1932), English world champion weightlifter
 Harel Levy (born 1978), Israeli professional tennis player; highest world singles ranking # 30
 Len Levy (1921–1999), American football player and professional wrestler
 Lenny Levy (1913–1993), American Major League Baseball coach
 Marv Levy (born 1925), American and Canadian football coach
 Maximilian Levy (born 1987), German track cyclist
 Moshe Levy (athlete) (born 1952), Israeli Paralympic athlete
 Nadine Netter Levy (born 1944), American tennis player
 Raphaël Lévy (born 1981), French Magic: The Gathering player
 Ronny Levy (born 1966), Israeli football manager
 Syd Levy (born 1922), South African tennis player
 Uriah P. Levy (1792–1862), American sailor and curator

In other fields
 Bernard Levy (died 1987), pioneer of kosher certification in the United States
 Chandra Levy (1977–2001), American murder victim
 David Levy (inventor) (born c. 1967), American inventor and entrepreneur
 David L. Levy (1936–2014), American children's rights activist; Board President of Children's Rights Council
 Elias Levy (fl. c. 2000), computer security specialist
 Felix A. Levy (1884–1963), American rabbi
 June Rockwell Levy (1886–1971), American philanthropist
 Liza Levy, South Africa-born American Jewish community activist
 Ludwig Levy (1854–1907), German architect
 Maurice Lévy (1838–1910), French engineer
 Yvette Lévy (born 1926), French educator and Holocaust survivor

See also 
 Levy (disambiguation), includes list of people with the given name
Levi (surname)
 Levie (disambiguation), includes list of people with name Levie

References

Jewish surnames
Hebrew-language surnames
Levite surnames
Surnames of Scottish origin
Irish royal families

fr:Levy
nl:Levy
sl:Lévy